Desmodema is a small genus of ribbonfishes.

Species
There are currently two recognized species in this genus:
 Desmodema lorum Rosenblatt & J. L. Butler, 1977 (Whiptail ribbonfish)
 Desmodema polystictum (J. D. Ogilby, 1898) (Polka-dot ribbonfish)

References

Lampriformes